Shakuni is one of the antagonists of the Hindu epic Mahabharata. He was the prince of the kingdom of Gandhara when introduced, later becoming its king after the death of his father, Subala. He was the brother of Gandhari and the maternal uncle of the Kauravas.

Portrayed as intelligent, crafty and devious, Shakuni supported his nephews, particularly the eldest, Duryodhana, in plotting against their cousinsthe Pandavas. It was Shakuni who played the game of dice against Yudhishthira, one of the seminal events in the epic. He was a master of manipulating the game using loaded dice, which caused the exile of the Pandavas and the consolidation of the power of the Kauravas. During the Kurukshetra War, Shakuni was killed by the youngest Pandava, Sahadeva.

Etymology and epithets
The Sanskrit word "Shakuni" means 'a large bird'. In the epic, Shakuni has been referred to by many names. Shakuni shares his name with some other figures, including a divine-serpent, a rishi, a son of King Ikshvaku, and an asura son of Hiranyaksha who was the father of Vrikasura.

"Saubala" is a prominent name of Shakuni, derived from Subala, the name of Shakuni's father. Other patryomics include Subalaputra, Subalraja, and Saubaleya. As Shakuni belonged to the royal family of Gandhara, he was also referred to as Gāndara, Gandharnaresh, Gandhararaja and Gandharapati. Parvatiya ('he who is from the mountains') and Kitava ('gambler') are also epithets of Shakuni.

Early life and family
According to the Mahabharata, Shakuni was an incarnation of Dvapara Yuga, the personified third epoch in Hindu cosmology. He was the son of Subala, the king of Gandhara (in the northwest of the Indian subcontinent, its capital Takshashila being in the vicinity of the modern city of Islamabad). Shakuni had a sister named Gandhari, and many brothers among whom Achala and Vrishaka were the most prominent. Shakuni's wife is unnamed, but some modern retelling name her Arshi. Uluka was his son and he served as a messenger during the Kurukshetra War. The epic's Ashvamedhika Parva mentions a descendant of Shakuni who ruled Gandhara after the battle of Kurukshetra.

The Adi Parva of the Mahabharata says that Bhishma, then the guardian of the Kuru kingdom, went to Gandhara to arrange the marriage of its princess, Gandhari, to Dhritarashtra, the elder son of Vichitravirya, who was blind by birth. Subala was initially reluctant due to Dhritarashtra's blindness, but later agreed after considering the high reputation of the Kuru royal family. Shakuni accompanied his sister to Hastinapura, the capital of the Kurus. After the marriage, Shakuni returned to Gandhara.

Hatred for the Kurus?
Much later, in some post-Mahabharata literature and in retelling stories and novels, Shakuni was portrayed as a victim, who sought revenge on the Kurus. Mythologist Devdutt Pattanaik speculated that these narratives were created to remind us all not to judge people without learning of their story. According to him, 
A legend in the eighth century Jain text the Harivamsa Purana says that at Gandhari's birth astrologers predicted that her husband would have a short life. Fearing this, Subala and his sons get Gandhari "married" to a goat prior to her marriage to Dhritarashtra, and sacrificed the goat in order to nullify the defect. After Gandhari's marriage, Bhishma discovers this and becomes enraged at Subala for letting a "widow" become a bride of his family and decides to punish Subala and his family. Subala and his sons are captured and put in prison. Only one grain of rice is given to each captive. Knowing that Shakuni is the wisest among them and most able to take revenge, the prisoners give all their food to Shakuni so that he can survive. Eventually, Subala and his other sons die, while Shakuni survives and is released. This story is not found in the original Mahabharata and is strongly reminiscent of a similar tale told about the fall of the Nanda dynasty in the Kathāsaritsāgara.

Yet another tale says that Bhishma imprisoned Shakuni's family as they refused to give Gandhari in marriage to the blind Dhritarashtra. Some other narratives replace Bhishma with Duryodhana as the one who captured and killed Subala and his other sons. In another story, Shakuni plotted against the Kurus because he was unhappy with the marriage of his beloved sister to a blind person, which he thought an insult to his family.

In all of these stories, Shakuni swears to avenge this by slowly destroying Hastinapura. He achieves this by poisoning the mind of his volatile nephew Duryodhana into instigating the war with the Pandavas, which destroyed the Kuru line. Some versions of the story describe Shakuni using the bones of his dead family members to create dice that will never lose in a game, as Shakuni's father's soul enters the dice to make it roll to whatever number Shakuni wanted.

None of these tales are mentioned in the Mahabharata. In the Mahabharata, Subala and his sons attended the Rajasuya yajna of Yudhishthira, Shakuni's brothers fought in the great war at Kurukshetra, and they were killed during the conflict.

Influence on Hastinapura
The Mahabharata states that Shakuni lived in Hastinapura and looked after his blindfolded sister and her children, the Kauravas. Similarly, Krishna (the maternal cousin of the Pandavas) helps the Pandava brothers throughout the epic. The family of Draupadi (the common wife of the Pandavas) also plays a major role in raising her children. Based on such examples, many scholars theorise that during the "Mahabharata era", the maternal families might have played major roles in the family policies.

Shakuni had a close alliance with his eldest nephew, Duryodhana and wanted him to become the next Emperor of the Kuru Clan. Throughout the epic, he helps Duryodhana in his plans to take the throne from the Pandavas.

The game of dice

In the epic, Shakuni's most integral episode is during the gambling match between Duryodhana and Yudhishthira (the eldest Pandava brother). The event is one of the turning points in the epic, which leads to the humiliation of Draupadi and the exile of the Pandavas.

The Sabha Parva of the Mahabharata narrates the event. When a succession dispute between Duryodhana and Yudhishthira arises, Dhritarashtra divides the Kuru Kingdom into two regions. The Pandavas found the city of Indraprastha, which serves as the capital of their half of the ancestral domains. To achieve imperial status, Yudhishthira decides to perform the Rajasuya yajna and the royal families of different kingdoms are invited to the sacrifice. Shakuni, along with his father, brothers and nephews, also attends the event. After the yajna is completed, all the guests return to their kingdoms, but Shakuni and Duryodhana stay on and witness the wealth and prosperity of the Pandavas.

Duryodhana becomes jealous of the Pandavas, and he turns weak and pale due to sadness and anxiety. Shakuni consoles him and suggests that Dhritarashtra organise a game of dice, and invite Yudhishthira. He tells him that Yudhishthira is fond of gambling and wouldn't decline the invitation. Shakuni also insists that they could snatch the wealth and prosperity of the Pandavas, since he is extremely talented in rolling the dice and although Yudhishthira loves playing it, he is not skilled in it. Upon the repeated urging of Duryodhana and Shakuni, Dhritarashtra agrees. Yudhishthira agrees, and arrives in Hastinapura accompanied by his brothers and their wife. Duryodhana declares that Shakuni would represent him in the game. As the stakes rise with each round, Shakuni wins Yudhishthira's treasures, then his kingdom, and goads Yudhishthira into gambling away the freedom his brothers, Bhima, Arjuna, Nakula, Sahadeva and finally Yudhishthira himself. In a final throw, the freedom of Draupadi is also lost. After Draupadi manages to take back their possessions as a boon from Dhritrashtra, the Pandavas return back to their capital. Duryodhana invites Yudhishthira for another game, with the losing side being exiled for 13 years. With Shakuni's skills, Duryodhana wins again and the Pandavas are forced into exile.

Kurukshetra War
Shakuni was the Strategist of the Kaurava army. 
On the 18th day before the war, Duryodhana tried to convince Shakuni to be the Commander-in-Chief of his army but he refused and preferred Shalya instead. Shakuni participated in the Kurukshetra War and defeated many warriors.

On the very first day of the war, Shakuni, Duryodhana and Dushasana attacked Yudhishthira to try and kill him but they failed. During the war, Shakuni defeated the Upapandava Shrutasena (Nakula’s son). He also killed king Sahadev who was a close friend of the pandavas and the king of Maghada. Shakuni also killed his cousin Jayadev on the same day. On the tenth day, he tries to stop Arjuna and Shikandi from reaching Bhishma and manages to stab Shikandi in a sword fight. However, he is stopped by Virata who attacks him.

On the 13th day, Shakuni and other Maharathis attacked and killed Abhimanyu. Many of them staged a sneak attack on Abhimanyu. On 14th day, he fought with Nakula to save Jayadratha but was defeated. After Jayadratha's death, Shakuni planned a battle at midnight. During that terrible fight at night, he was vanquished by Nakula.

Illusion of Shakuni:
An unknown fact from the Mahabaharata, is that Shakuni was also a great expert in making illusions. The Drona parva of the Mahabharata, narrates an incident where Shakuni made 100 different types of illusions against Arjuna, the greatest archer. Various types of weapons, wild animals, deadly creatures and birds were made as an illusion as if they are marching faster towards Arjuna and Krishna. However, Arjuna used a counter weapon named " Adityam" to encounter these illusions. He then removed all the illusions created by Shakuni.

Death
After the Game of Dice episode in the Mahabharata, the youngest of the Pandava brothers Sahadeva had taken an oath to avenge Draupadi's insult and had sworn to kill Shakuni, the mastermind of the episode.

On the 18th day of the Mahabharata war, the Pandavas attacked Shakuni, Uluka and their army. As Duryodhana and his other brothers rushed to protect their uncle, Bhima stepped in, fought the remaining Kauravas and killed many of them (except Duryodhana). Meanwhile, Nakula killed many prominent Gandharan warriors and the bodyguards of Uluka. Sahadeva fought Shakuni and Uluka and not long afterwards, killed Uluka. Shakuni became furious and attacked Sahadeva. He broke his chariot and bow, but Sahadeva ascended another chariot and fought Shakuni ferociously. After many attacks and tackles, both of them descended from their chariots to settle things in a duel. Sahadeva  then pierced his axe in chest of Shakuni and killed him, fulfilling his oath.

Legacy

The one and only temple in the world dedicated to Shakuni, called Malanada Maladeva (Shakuni) Temple, is situated in a small village called Pavithreswaram of Kottarakkara Taluk in Kollam district of Kerala, India. Here, a granite stone under a huge Kanjira (Strychnos nux vomica) tree is worshipped as the seat of Shakuni where he is seen in a posture meditating Lord Shiva, one of the Trimurtis of Hinduism.

Footnotes

References

Further reading

 The Story of Shakuni, Sribd.
 Suchetana Sen Kumar. 'Soubal Shakuni' published from Ekalavya Prakashan on 2021 (previously published on 2020 in Kolkata international book fair)

Characters in the Mahabharata
Hinduism in Afghanistan
Board game players
Gamblers
Gandhara